The Pink Fir Apple potato is a maincrop potato variety with a long knobbly shape, pink skin, and creamy waxy flesh. Its shape makes it difficult to peel.

Pink Fir Apple potato was first imported to the United Kingdom from France in 1850, and in 1996 was crossed with the Désirée variety to form the Anya potato for Sainsbury's supermarkets.

Characteristics

References

Potato cultivars